South Shore is one of 77 defined community areas of Chicago, Illinois, United States. Located  on the city's South Side, the area is named for its location along the city's southern lakefront. Although South Shore has seen a greater than 40% decrease in residents since Chicago's population peaked in the 1950s, the area remains one of the most densely populated neighborhoods on the South Side. The community benefits from its location along the waterfront, its accessibility to Lake Shore Drive, and its proximity to major institutions and attractions such as the University of Chicago, the Museum of Science and Industry, and Jackson Park.

History
Like all of what is now the City of Chicago, what is now the South Shore community area was inhabited by a number of Algonquian peoples, including the Mascouten and Miami. After the expulsion of Native Americans by white settlers in the nineteenth century, became characterized by small settlements; Essex, Bryn Mawr, Parkside, Cheltenham Beach, and Windsor Park. The area, bounded by 67th and 79th streets to the north and south and by Stony Island Avenue and Lake Michigan to the west and east, was mostly swampland in the 1850s when Ferdinand Rohn, a German truck farmer, utilized trails along the area's high ground to transport his goods to Chicago. In 1861, the Illinois General Assembly incorporated Hyde Park Township, which included South Shore. The area's population grew as workers in the nearby steel industry settled in the area. Following the June 29, 1889 elections, the South Shore community area was annexed into the City of Chicago with the entirety of Hyde Park Township. The location of the World's Columbian Exposition in nearby Jackson Park prompted the sale of land and building lots. As in other parts of Chicago, the desire for affordable housing at the start of the twentieth century led to the large scale construction of bungalows. Unlike other areas in which bungalows were built en masse, South Shore's bungalow residents were largely affluent. Additionally, Shore Shore was the destination for white flight from Washington Park as immigrants and African Americans moved there.

After racially restrictive covenants were declared unconstitutional by Shelley v. Kraemer, African American families began to move out of the overcrowded black neighborhoods into South Shore. The South Shore Commission initiated a program they called "managed integration", designed to check the physical decline of the community and to achieve racial balance. The initiative was largely unsuccessful on both counts. Per the 1950 census, South Shore had 79,000 residents and was 96% white with a large Jewish population. In 1960, the population had fallen to 73,000 people and was 90% White and 10% black. Other white residents chose to resist this change through violence against African Americans who chose to move to the neighborhood. By 1970, the population had risen to 81,000 and was 69% black and 28% white. By 1980, the population had fallen slightly to 78,000, but was 94% black.

By the late 1990s South Shore had developed into a middle-class African American community. Although the commercial strips on 71st and 75th still struggled, developers built a shopping plaza at 71st and Jeffery which is relatively successful. The cultural life of the area has been enhanced since the Park District purchased the waning South Shore Country Club in 1972, converting it into a cultural center. South Shore remains a destination for some who desire a congenial middle-class community on Chicago's South Side. The South Shore Current Magazine was launched with a mission to share the "Good News from Chicago's Cultural Soul Coast." The masthead reads: "Thriving as a catalyst for economic development, reflecting a truthful image, and a virtual meeting place for the South Shore Community."

On July 14, 2018, the community clashed with the Chicago Police Department after a local barber, Harith Augustus, was shot multiple times by a police officer at 71st Street and Chappel Avenue. Body camera footage without audio was released immediately contrary to past practices of months-long waits for video in other police shootings. Footage taken by body cameras of other officers has not been released.

Neighborhoods and sub-areas

Jackson Park Highlands

The Jackson Park Highlands District is a sixteen block area bounded by East 67th Street on the north. East 71st Street on the south, South Cregier Avenue on the west, and South Jeffrey Boulevard on the east.

The Jackson Park Highlands District is a historic district in the South Shore community area of Chicago. The district was built in 1905 by various architects. It was designated a Chicago Landmark on October 25, 1989. It is regarded as one of the South Side's upper-middle to affluent neighborhoods; others being Hyde Park, Kenwood, Bridgeport, Beverly, Mount Greenwood, and the western section of Morgan Park, and parts of Chatham. The area takes its name from a ridge that formerly overlooked Jackson Park. Architectural styles represented in this district include American Foursquare, Classical Revival, Queen Anne, Dutch Colonial, Colonial Revival, Tudor, and Prairie School.

The neighborhood has numerous cul-de-sacs with limited vehicular access. Directly north of the neighborhood lies the 18-hole Jackson Park Golf Course, a part of the Chicago Park District's Jackson Park, the third largest park in the city and home of the 1893 Columbian World Exposition.

The neighborhood was commissioned in the early 20th century. Its initial purpose was as a collection of model homes that would overlook the prized Jackson Park, which had hosted the World's Fair less than a decade prior. The neighborhood featured some of the most innovative concepts of the time, including large front yard setbacks,  lot widths, underground utilities, and no alleys. When Chicago annexed Hyde Park just in time for the 1890 census (to beat out Philadelphia as the second largest metro area in the nation), the Highlands were left under governorship of the South Shore area.

Jeffery–Cyril Historic District

The Jeffery–Cyril Historic District is a national historic district in the South Shore neighborhood of Chicago, Illinois. The district comprises a cluster of six apartment buildings on Jeffery Boulevard, 71st Place, and Cyril Avenue. All six buildings were built between 1927 and 1929. The district was added to the National Register of Historic Places on May 5, 1986.

South Shore Bungalow Historic District

The South Shore Bungalow Historic District is a residential historic district in the South Shore neighborhood of Chicago, Illinois. The district contains 229 Chicago bungalows and twenty other residential buildings built between 1911 and 1930. The district was added to the National Register of Historic Places on December 10, 2008.

Architecture

The South Shore Cultural Center, previously the South Shore Country Club, began as a lakefront retreat for the wealthiest of Chicago's movers and shakers.  The firm of Marshall and Fox, architects of the Drake, Blackstone, and Edgewater Beach hotels, were hired to design an opulent, Mediterranean-style clubhouse for a membership that included some of Chicago's most prominent families. The grounds provided private stables and members-only beach, and golf course. Tennis, horseback riding, and skeet shooting were enjoyed by guests the likes of Jean Harlow, Will Rogers, and Amelia Earhart. Between the first and second World Wars, a housing boom brought a development of luxury cooperative apartments and mansions to the neighborhood surrounding the club. In 1974 the club held its last members-only event. Today, the Chicago Park District owns the property. It has been restored to its original design and is now open to the public. A major drawback to the South Shore and surrounding South Chicago neighborhoods is that they are one of the few remaining Chicago lakefront neighborhoods that lack a fully publicly accessible neighborhood shoreline. There are lakefront gaps between the existing South Shore Cultural Center and Rainbow Beach to its south. Even larger masses of lakefront land along the South Chicago neighborhood (at the abandoned USX steel mill) with their beautiful vistas of the city's lakefront and Chicago skyline are undergoing development as parks and not completely available for recreational enjoyment by the adjacent neighborhood residents. Presently, Chicago Lakeside Development has proposed plans that call for the completion of this southern portion of lakefront with the development of new parklands, beaches, and a continuous waterfront bicycle and jogging path that will link Calumet Park and Beach in the East Side neighborhood to the South Shore Cultural Center in South Shore. Completion of such a project would result in improved access to Chicago's southern lakefront and connect it to neighborhoods such as Hyde Park and Bronzeville to the north.

At the northern end of South Shore is the historic district Jackson Park Highlands, one of Chicago's greatest examples of structural history and 19th-century architecture, with an abundance of homes in the style of American Foursquare, Colonial Revival, and Renaissance Revival on suburban-sized lots.

Located in the Bryn Mawr section of South Shore is the Allan Miller House at 7121 South Paxton Avenue. Commissioned by advertising executive Allan Miller, this home is an excellent example of Prairie-style architecture. Built in 1915, it is Chicago's only surviving building designed by John Van Bergen, a former member of Frank Lloyd Wright's architecture firm.

Politics

The South Shore community area has supported the Democratic Party in the past two presidential elections by overwhelming margins. In the 2016 presidential election, the South Shore cast 18,130 votes for Hillary Clinton and cast 373 votes for Donald Trump (96.07% to 1.98%). In the 2012 presidential election, South Shore cast 22,515 votes for Barack Obama and cast 222 votes for Mitt Romney (98.77% to 0.97%).

Culture and religion
The Nation of Islam National Center and Mosque Maryam are at 7351 South Stony Island Avenue. The National Black United Front has its headquarters in the community.

The Roman Catholic Archdiocese of Chicago operates Catholic churches. On July 1, 2020, Our Lady of Peace, St. Bride, and St. Philip Neri in South Shore and Our Lady Gate of Heaven Church in Jeffery Manor will merge.

Transportation
The South Shore community area has five stations along the South Chicago Branch of the Metra Electric District. In South Shore, the South Chicago Branch runs eastward along East 71st Street making stops at Stony Island, Bryn Mawr, South Shore stations before going southeast along South Exchange Avenue making stops at Windsor Park, and Cheltenham stations. In addition, the 75th Street station is on the Greater Grand Crossing side of the border between that area and South Shore.

Education
Chicago Public Schools operates district public schools.

In addition Urban Prep Academies operates the South Shore Campus.

Muhammad University of Islam, a Nation of Islam-affiliated primary and secondary school, is adjacent to the Mosque Maryam.

Notable people 

 Marshall Bennett (1915–2018), real estate developer credited with creating the modern industrial park. He was a childhood resident of South Shore.
 Bo Diddley (1928–2008), singer, guitarist, songwriter and music producer. He resided in South Shore.
 Frank Drake (born 1930), astrophyscist and co-founder of Project Ozma. He was a childhood resident of 7347 South Crandon Avenue and a graduate of South Shore High School.
 Stanley Elkin (1930–1995), novelist, short story writer, and essayist. He was a childhood resident of South Shore.
 Larry Ellison (born 1944), co-founder of Oracle Corporation. He was raised in the South Shore community area by his adoptive parents.
 James T. Farrell (1904–1979), novelist, short-story writer and poet. He resided at 2023 East 72nd Street.
 Enrico Fermi (1901–1954), physicist and the creator of the world's first nuclear reactor. He resided in South Shore.
 Thomas Patrick Gerrity (1913–1968), General in the United States Air Force who commanded the Air Force Logistics Command from 1967 until his death one year later. He resided at 7838 South Excanaba Avenue for a time.
 Fred Goetz (1897–1934), Chicago Outfit member and a suspected participant in the Valentine's Day Massacre. He resided at 7827 South South Shore Drive at the time of his murder.
 Fred Holstein (1942–2004), folk singer. He was raised in the South Shore community area.
 Murray Humphreys (1899–1965), member of the Chicago Outfit. He resided at 7710 S. Bennett Ave. for most of his criminal career.
 Robert Irving III (born 1953), musician and longtime South Shore resident.
 Jacqueline Jackson (born 1944), peace activist and wife of Jesse Jackson. She resided in South Shore for a time.
 Jesse Jackson (born 1941), activist, Baptist minister, and politician. Jackson moved to South Shore in 1960 after his financial supporters purchased him a home in the area.
 Jesse Jackson Jr. (born 1965), member of the United States House of Representatives from Illinois's 2nd congressional district, son of Jesse and Jacqueline Jackson, and husband of Sandi Jackson. He was raised in South Shore and, as of 2018, is a current resident of South Shore.
 Jonathan Jackson (born 1966), businessman, activist, and son of Jesse and Jacqueline Jackson. He was a childhood resident of South Shore.
 Sandi Jackson (born 1963), politician and wife of Jesse Jackson Jr. She resided in South Shore during her political career.
 Santita Jackson (born 1963), singer, political commentator, and daughter of Jesse and Jacqueline Jackson. She was a childhood resident of South Shore.
 Jeremiah Jae (born 1989), rapper, record producer, and multi-media artist. He is a South Shore resident.
 Ferguson Jenkins (born 1942), professional baseball player. He resided at the home of fellow player Billy Williams for a time during their professional careers.
 Gene Krupa (1909–1973), jazz drummer, bandleader and composer. He was a childhood resident of South Shore.
 Ramsey Lewis (born 1935), jazz composer, pianist and radio personality. He resided in South Shore.
 Marv Levy (born 1925), football coach. He was raised in the South Shore neighborhood.
 David Mamet (born 1947), playwright. His family moved from Hyde Park to South Shore while he was a teenager.
 Raymond S. McKeough (1888–1979), member of the United States House of Representatives from Illinois's 2nd congressional district. He resided at 7815 South Euclid Avenue while in Congress.
 Carol Moseley Braun (born 1947), first African American woman elected to the United States Senate. She lived in South Shore during her political career.
 Michelle Obama (born 1964), 44th First Lady of the United States. She was born and raised in South Shore.
 Suze Orman (born 1951), author, financial advisor, motivational speaker, and television host.
 Jabari Parker (born 1995), professional basketball player. He was raised in South Shore.
 Mandy Patinkin (born 1952), actor and singer. He was a childhood resident of South Shore.
 Elia W. Peattie (1862–1935), author, journalist and critic. She resided near East 74th Street and South South Shore Drive for much of her life.
 Harry Mark Petrakis (1923–2021), novelist known for depictions of Greek-American life. He resided at 7603 South Ridgeland Avenue for a time.
 Dean Richards (born 1954), film critic and entertainment reporter for WGN-TV. He was raised in South Shore.
 Craig Robinson (born 1962), college basketball coach.
 Carlo Rotella, professor and recipient of the 2006 Guggenheim Fellowship. He was raised at South Oglesby Avenue and East 71st Street.
 Sebastian Rotella, foreign correspondent, investigative journalist, and novelist. He was a childhood resident of South Shore.
 Bashir Salahuddin (born 1976), actor, writer, and comedian. He was raised in South Shore on South Constance Avenue.
 Gale Sayers (1943–2020), professional football player. He resided in South Shore during his time with the Chicago Bears.
 Elmer Schnackenberg (1889–1968), Judge of the United States Court of Appeals for the Seventh Circuit. He resided at 2706 East 75th Place during his first tenure in the Illinois House of Representatives.
 Barre Seid (born 1932), businessman and former CEO of Tripp Lite. In 1950, he resided with his family at 7022 S Constance Ave.
 Deborah Senn (1949–2022), 7th Insurance Commissioner of Washington from 1993 to 2001. She was raised in the South Shore neighborhood.
 Johnny Torrio (1882–1957), early member of the Chicago Outfit. Torrio resided in South Shore for a portion of his criminal career before being incarcerated in Waukegan.
 Richard B. Vail (1895–1955), member of the U.S. House of Representatives from Illinois's 2nd district during the 80th and 82 U.S. Congresses. He resided at 6946 South Bennett Avenue while a Congressman.
 Charles R. Walgreen, Sr. (1873–1939), businessman who founded Walgreens. He resided at 6912 South Shore Drive in 1928.
 James Watson (born 1928), scientist and co-author of the paper which deduced the double helix structure of DNA. He was raised at 7922 South Luella Avenue and graduated from South Shore High School.
 Lee Weiner (born 1939), activist and member of the Chicago Seven. He was a childhood resident of South Shore.
 Kanye West (born 1977), rapper. West was raised at 7815 S. South Shore Drive.
 Billy Williams (born 1938), professional baseball player. He purchased a home near East 74th Street and South Constance Avenue in 1966. Williams resided in South Shore until moving to Glen Ellyn, Illinois in 1974.

References

External links

 
 Official City of Chicago South Shore Community Map

Community areas of Chicago
South Side, Chicago
Beaches of Cook County, Illinois